Miriam Palma Defensor-Santiago   (née Defensor; June 15, 1945 – September 29, 2016) was a Filipino scholar, academic, lawyer, judge, author, and stateswoman who served in all three branches of the Philippine government: judicial, executive, and legislative. Defensor Santiago was named one of The 100 Most Powerful Women in the World in 1997 by The Australian. She was known for being a long-serving Senator of the Republic of the Philippines, an elected judge of the International Criminal Court, and the sole female recipient of the Philippines' highest national honor, the Quezon Service Cross.

In 1988, Defensor Santiago was named laureate of the Ramon Magsaysay Award for government service, with a citation for bold and moral leadership in cleaning up a graft-ridden government agency. After being appointed by President Corazon Aquino as Secretary of Agrarian Reform from 1989 to 1990, she ran in the 1992 presidential election but was controversially defeated in events that involved a car crash injury and power outages during voting process. Defensor Santiago would then serve three terms in the Philippine Senate, where she was known for supporting progressive laws, and authored or campaigned anti-corruption bills.

In 2012, Defensor Santiago became the first Filipina and the first Asian from a developing country to be elected a judge of the International Criminal Court. She later resigned the post, citing chronic fatigue syndrome, which turned out to be lung cancer.

On October 13, 2015, Defensor Santiago controversially declared her third candidacy for President of the Philippines in the 2016 election after her doctors from the United States declared her cancer "stable" and "receded", but lost the election due to public concern for her health. In April 2016, her last appointed post was part of the International Development Law Organization Advisory Council (IDLO), an intergovernmental body that promotes the rule of law. She died from complications from her cancer on September 29, 2016, and was buried days later at Loyola Memorial Park in Marikina. In December 2018, the prestigious Quezon Service Cross was posthumously conferred upon Santiago, making her the first and, so far, only woman and the sixth person ever to be enthroned in the country's highest roster.

Defensor Santiago was known as the Dragon Lady, the Platinum Lady, the Incorruptible Lady, the Impregnable Lady, Feisty Senator, The Doctor of All Laws, the Omniscient Woman and most popularly, the Iron Lady of Asia.  She is colloquially known in Philippine pop culture as simply Miriam or MDS, and is positively cited for her lifelong dedication to public service in the Philippine government.

Early life and education
Defensor Santiago was born Miriam Palma Defensor in Iloilo City, to Benjamin Defensor, a local judge, and Dimpna Palma, a college dean. She was the eldest of seven children. She graduated valedictorian in grade school, high school, undergraduate school. She graduated high school in Iloilo Provincial High School (now Iloilo National High School) and served as the Editor-in-Chief (EIC) of the said high school's student publication "The Ilonggo". In 1965, Defensor Santiago graduated with a Bachelor of Arts degree in political science, magna cum laude from the University of the Philippines Visayas. After graduation, she was elected to the Pi Gamma Mu and Phi Kappa Phi honor societies.

She proceeded to the University of the Philippines College of Law. There, she was champion in numerous oratorical contests and debates. She became the first female editor of the student newspaper, The Philippine Collegian, and was twice appointed ROTC muse. She graduated Bachelor of Laws, cum laude, from the University of the Philippines College of Law in Diliman.

Defensor Santiago went on a fellowship to the United States, and earned the Master of Laws and Doctor of Juridical Science degrees at the University of Michigan, Ann Arbor. She finished both degrees in a period of only one and a half years.  Following school, she took a position as special assistant to the Secretary of Justice.  She also taught political science at the Trinity University of Asia. She was law professor at the University of the Philippines Diliman, teaching evening classes for some ten years.

She has studied at several universities, including Oxford and Harvard law summer schools; Cambridge; and The Hague Academy of International Law.  She earned the degree Master of Religious Studies (without thesis) at the Maryhill School of Theology.

In Oxford, she was a research fellow at St. Hilda's College and also took a summer program in law at St. Edmund's Hall. At Cambridge, she was a research fellow at the Lauterpacht Research Centre for International Law.

Career

Department of Justice
Defensor-Santiago became a special assistant to the Secretary of Justice for ten years after her higher studies abroad.

United Nations
From 1979 to 1980, Defensor Santiago served as Legal Officer of the UN High Commissioner for Refugees at Geneva, Switzerland. She was assigned to the Conferences and Treaties Section. She became skilled at treaty negotiation and drafting.  She resigned her position when her father in the Philippines developed prostate cancer.

Judge during martial law
Defensor Santiago was appointed judge of the Regional Trial Court (RTC) of Quezon City, Metro Manila by President Ferdinand Marcos. She was the youngest judge appointed to Metro Manila, and exempted from the practice of first serving as a judge outside Metro Manila. As a RTC judge, she quickly proclaimed a "no postponement" policy.  At that time, cases were tried in segments that were usually a month apart, resulting in trials that took years to finish.  Lawyers were prone to seek postponement of trial. As a result, trial judges scheduled ten or fifteen cases a day, so that they could make up for cases postponed. Defensor Santiago scheduled only five cases a day, heard each case, and disposed of the highest number of cases in her first year in office. 

Defensor Santiago became nationally famous when she issued perhaps the first decision to rule against martial law. At that time, alleged illegal public assemblies were declared as crimes and were punishable by death.  A large group of activist students from the University of the Philippines and Ateneo, as well as activists in the film industry, staged a rally in a central business district, and denounced the First Lady for her excesses.  To retaliate, Marcos issued a Preventive Detention Action order which authorized the military to hold suspects indefinitely without bail.  The students faced the dire prospect of missing their final exams and, for many of them, missing graduation. Defensor Santiago suspended hearings on all other pending cases, and conducted whole-day trials.  In the end, she ordered the military to allow the students to post bail.  After promulgating her decision at the end of the day, Defensor Santiago drove herself to the state university, where she was teaching law. The Philippine Jaycees, the Philippine Lions, and the YMCA Philippines all gave her awards for judicial excellence.

Immigration Commissioner
After martial law, in 1988, President Corazon Aquino appointed Defensor Santiago as commissioner of the Bureau of Immigration and Deportation. At that time, the BID was one of the most corrupt government agencies in Southeast Asia. Defensor Santiago declared the Philippines as "the fake passport capital of the world", and directed raids against criminal syndicates, including the Yakuza.  She filled the CID detention center with alien criminals, and ordered construction of another detention center. She extended to legal aliens protection from widespread extortion by requesting President Aquino to issue an executive order that authorized the "alien legalization program".

She received serious death threats, but proclaimed: "I eat death threats for breakfast". A member of the House of Representatives, Laguna Rep. Nereo Joaquin, delivered a privilege speech in 1992 and denounced her raids against pedophile communities in Central Luzon run by alien pedophiles. Defensor Santiago responded by calling him "fungus face".

The Rockefeller Foundation named her a laureate of the Magsaysay Award for government service – "for bold and moral leadership in cleaning up a graft-ridden government agency."

Agrarian Reform Secretary
President Corazon Aquino promoted Defensor Santiago to member of her cabinet, as Secretary of Agrarian Reform. Under a controversial law passed by Congress and signed by President Aquino, all agricultural landholdings were taken by the government and divided among the farmers.  Each landowner was allowed to keep only five hectares, and each farmer received three hectares. Payment was in bonds of the Land Bank. To subvert the law, big landowners applied for conversion of the classification of their land as agricultural, to classification as commercial, residential, or industrial. The process became the widespread "conversion scandal of agrarian reform". The DAR officials themselves were the biggest culprits, because they sold conversion permits for bribes on a market rate set at certain amounts per hectare involved in the conversion. Defensor Santiago stopped the conversion scandal, and appeased the landowners by enhancing the incentives for voluntary offers by the landowners for the sale of their landholdings, which entitled them to an additional five percent cash payment. When asked if the hacienda belonging to the president's family should be covered by agrarian reform, Defensor Santiago replied that the family's hacienda should be distributed among the farmers. Shortly thereafter President Aquino accepted Defensor Santiago's resignation.

1992 presidential campaign

Defensor Santiago's candidacy for President of the Philippines was confirmed on February 19, 1990. She later organized the People's Reform Party (PRP) and ran with a senatorial ticket during the 1992 presidential campaign. Ramon Magsaysay Jr. was her running mate. While campaigning on April 28, 1991, she was severely injured in car crash, which she claimed was an assassination attempt. She was wearing a white bush jacket which became splattered with blood that gushed from a wound to her head. On orders of President Aquino, she was airlifted from Tarlac to a Manila hospital. She underwent surgery on the jaw, and at one point a Catholic priest administered the last rites of the dying. Two months later, she was back on the campaign trail.

Defensor Santiago has been dubbed as "The Iron Lady of Asia" and the "Dragon Lady" due to her scathing but bold eloquence both in leadership and writing. She cites physicist Marie Curie and former British Prime Minister Margaret Thatcher as her major influences throughout her political career, with Thatcher praising her for her book Cutting Edge during their meeting while the Prime Minister visited the Philippines.

Defensor Santiago was leading the canvassing of votes for the first five days. Following a string of power outages, the tabulation concluded, and Ramos was declared president-elect. Defensor Santiago filed a protest before the Supreme Court as electoral tribunal, citing the power outages during the counting of votes as evidence of massive fraud. Her election protest was eventually dismissed on a technicality.

The public outrage over the presidential results prompted Newsweek to feature her and her rival on the cover with the question: "Was the Election Fair?"  In another cover story, Philippines Free Press magazine asked: "Who's the Real President?". The quote, 'Miriam won in the elections but lost in the counting' was popularized by the masses.

Senator

First term, 1995–2001
Defensor Santiago was first elected senator in 1995. In 1997, her presidential rival Fidel Ramos initiated a "people's campaign" for an infinite presidential term. Defensor Santiago harshly criticized Ramos' campaign and went to court. In a landmark case, Defensor Santiago vs COMELEC, she won and preserved the people's mandate for term limits. She again ran for president in the 1998 presidential elections, with running-mate Francisco Tatad, but lost amidst heavy propaganda concerning her mental health, which was later proven false.

She was one of the few senators who were against the opening of the brown envelope during the impeachment trial of then-President Joseph Estrada, who was her foe in the 1998 presidential elections. She said afterwards:Estrada was ousted in the Second EDSA Revolution in 2001, but was pardoned on October 26, 2007, by President Gloria Macapagal Arroyo. Defensor Santiago lost re-election to the Senate in 2001.

Second and third term, 2004–2016

Defensor Santiago ran for senator in 2004 and was elected. She ran again for senator in 2010 and won. During her three terms, she served as chair mostly of the foreign relations committee and the constitutional amendments committee. She was elected as official candidate of her party People's Reform Party, serving also as chair of the Foreign Affairs Committee of the Commission on Appointments. She exposed and named numerous jueteng (illegal gambling) lords and illegal-logging lords throughout her terms.

In 2011, Defensor Santiago was elected as a judge of the International Criminal Court (ICC) which hears cases against humanity for former heads of state. She was the first Asian from a third-world country to be elected to such a post. She resigned in 2014 after being diagnosed with lung cancer. She was one of the three senators who voted against the conviction of Supreme Court Chief Justice Renato Corona during his impeachment trial; Corona was ultimately found guilty for his failure to disclose to the public his statement of assets, liabilities and net worth.

In December 2012, she exposed that the Senate president, Juan Ponce Enrile, used Senate funds to give away as cash gifts. Every senator, except Defensor Santiago and two others, received ₱2 million. This led to the Priority Development Assistance Fund scandal, which put the Senate president behind bars with charges of plunder. Defensor Santiago's live Senate hearings in the case led to public outrage and support for Defensor Santiago's call to abolish the pork barrel system.

She was the first Filipino elected as a commissioner for the International Development Law Organization (IDLO) in 2016. Her role in the organization was advisory to the international law community.

Select laws authored
Among the laws that Defensor Santiago authored are:
Reproductive Health Act of 2012, which instills reproductive health education throughout the nation, and was backed by the majority of the population while criticized by religious institutions in the predominantly Roman Catholic country.
Sin Tax Law, which improved the taxation of the country and led to the economic revolutions that bolstered Philippine shares.
Climate Change Act of 2009, which mandated the entire nation to become a bastion for climate change responsiveness, mitigation, adaptation, and management.
Renewable Energy Act of 2008, which mandated the government to shift the energy source of the country from coal and oil into solar, wind, and other renewable sources – this became the foundation for the establishment of numerous wind and solar plants in the country which made the Philippines the 'Wind Energy Capital of Southeast Asia'.
Philippine Act on Crimes Against International Humanitarian Law, which safeguarded human rights in the entire nation.
Magna Carta of Women, which protected the rights of women in the country.
Unified Student Financial Assistance System for Tertiary Education (Unifast) Act, which enhanced the educational system in the country, paving way for the intellectual revolution in urban and rural areas.
Cybercrime Act of 2012, which protected the nation and its people from cybercrimes which infested the country's cyberspace.
Department of Information and Communication Technology Act, which established the Department of Information and Communication Technology for better information dissemination and better internet speed in the country
Archipelagic Baselines Act of 2009, which became one of the major bases for the country's claims on maritime sovereignty, including the South China Sea.

2016 presidential campaign

In October 2015, Defensor Santiago announced her intention to run in the 2016 Philippine presidential election after her cancer was deemed 'stable' and 'receded' by doctors from the United States. She later confirmed that Senator Bongbong Marcos would serve as her running mate for vice president. Her campaign focused on the youth sector for which she heavily advocated, making use of social media. She was a landslide winner in numerous polls conducted in various public and private universities and colleges in the country. Despite this, she lost in the elections.  Defensor Santiago was subsequently called "the greatest president we never had", a title which had been associated with her prior to her presidential run. The Youth for Miriam, a youth group that supported her on the campaign, rebranded as Youth Reform Movement and founded a standalone organization that bears her writings and literature as philosophical pillars.

Retirement
Even after retirement, Defensor Santiago continued to advocate the passage of many bills for the nation while in her Quezon City home. A few of these include an anti-dynasty bill, an act institutionalizing an age-appropriate curriculum to prevent the abduction, exploitation, and sexual abuse of children, an anti-epal bill, a freedom of information bill, and a magna carta for Philippine internet freedom.

Before her death, various groups in the country have been lauding her to join the candidacy for the Association of Southeast Asian Nations Secretary-General post where the elected Secretary-General will be positioned for 2018. Among other candidates for the position are AirAsia chief Tony Fernandes of Malaysia and an unstated representative from Brunei, which is the lead country for 2018–2022 according to tradition.

She was branded a "Distinguished Icon of Legal Excellence and Public Service" by the University of the Philippines in September 2016, and posthumously 
the "PUP Online Personality of the Year Award" by the Polytechnic University of the Philippines in November 2016.

Death

At the age of 71, Defensor Santiago died in her sleep at exactly 8:52 a.m. on September 29, 2016, while she was confined at the St. Luke's Medical Center in Taguig from lung cancer; several reports cited that Defensor Santiago died in her residence in La Vista Subdivision, Quezon City. Santiago's last words according to her husband were, "I accept this. I do not want to do anything heroic." While her last wish was to remain only in the memory of her own family. Her body lay in state at the Cathedral Grottos of the Immaculate Conception Cathedral in Cubao the following day. Following a Catholic funeral Mass, she was interred at the Loyola Memorial Park in Marikina on October 2, beside the tomb of her son Alexander, who died in 2003. Santiago's hometown, Iloilo City, declared a day of mourning for Defensor Santiago and flew the Philippine flag half-mast from September 29 – October 17, 2016. The local government said in an official statement that Defensor Santiago 'brought pride and honor to all Ilonggos'.

In June 2017, members of the Youth Reform Movement lobbied for the posthumous awarding of the Quezon Service Cross to Defensor Santiago. In September 2017, Senator Grace Poe, her freedom of information (FOI) ally and 2016 presidential rival, nominated Defensor Santiago to be awarded the Quezon Service Cross, the highest honor in the entire Republic, subject for approval of both houses of Congress and by President Rodrigo Duterte, who was also her presidential rival. On the same month, Senator Sonny Angara, who considers Defensor Santiago as his mentor, followed suit by filing another resolution nominating Defensor Santiago to become a laureate of the prestigious Quezon Service Cross, just days before Defensor Santiago's first death anniversary on September 29. The Senate expressed its full intent to confer Defensor Santiago the award. The president, through the Presidential Palace, welcomed the proposal to bestow the award to Defensor Santiago once both houses of Congress have ratified the document conferring such award. The House of Representatives is the only body left that has yet to express its intent to bestow the award to Defensor Santiago. Most members of the House are against Defensor Santiago's anti-political dynasty bill which she introduced in Congress. Santiago's bill is backed by the Constitution itself, where it mandates both chambers of Congress to enact such a law. On December 5, 2017, the president officially nominated Defensor Santiago for the award, awaiting concurrence of both chambers of Congress to officially bestow the award. Defensor Santiago is the sixth person, the first Visayan, and the first and only woman to be nominated for the award. She is the sixth person to be immortalized in the 69-year old national roster. On December 11, 2017, the Senate approved the bestowing of the award to Defensor Santiago. On February 20, 2018, the House of Representatives approved the bestowing of the award to Defensor Santiago. On December 3, 2018, the prestigious Quezon Service Cross was officially posthumously conferred upon Santiago, making her the sixth recipient and first and only woman to be included in the country's highest accolade and roster.

Political positions

Domestic policy

Federalism

Defensor Santiago is not in favor of federalism, stating in one interview that if the country would turn Federalist, "[That] the masses and the entire electorate will not [be able to] choose who the president will be. We leave that choice to a group of politicians, and we know how those politicians act. Mostly, their actions are always attended by corruption."

Charter Change

Defensor Santiago was in favor of amending the Constitution of the Philippines to enhance foreign investments in the country and to mandate that all high posts in government (senator, representative, president, vice president, governor, mayor, vice mayor, secretaries, undersecretaries, etc.) should have additional qualifications which are 'a college graduate' and must pass a duly-accredited government examination. Numerous politicians in the country are only high school or elementary graduates, and most college graduate officials have never passed the Civil Service Examination for Professionals (CSE-P). She argues that positions in government like administrative assistant must pass the CSE-P as a qualification, 'why not higher posts too?'.

Santiago, the then chairwoman of the Senate committee on constitutional amendments, said she was in favor of shifting to a parliamentary form of government in 2011.

Anti-political dynasty

Defensor Santiago was the principal author of the Anti-Dynasty Bill in the Senate and had been pushing for its immediate passage in Congress for more than a decade.

South China Sea dispute

She stressed during a live debate that the South China Sea is a sovereign territory of the Philippines and that the country should have a better military and police force and assets and should prioritize enhancing ties with allied nations, especially in the Association of Southeast Asian Nations (ASEAN). She was one of the international law experts who criticized China and aided in the Philippine case against China. The case was won by the Philippines in 2016. Despite this, China still does not recognize the ruling.

Mindanao

Defensor Santiago was against the Bangsamoro Basic Law, saying it is unconstitutional because it specifies that Bangsamoro will become a 'sub-state' of the republic which is illegal under the law. She prefers a more constitutional form of the Bangsamoro Basic Law which does not create a 'sub-state' government.

North Borneo dispute

Defensor Santiago was in favor of appointing a third-party to conduct under international law "inquiry and fact-finding" to resolve the North Borneo dispute, where the third-party is approved by both the national governments of Malaysia and the Philippines. She cited the 1907 Hague Convention for the Pacific Settlement of Disputes as motivator of her legal position. She said that this can end the dispute as it did in the 1981 involvement of mercenaries in an invasion of the Seychelles, the 1987 use of chemical weapons in the Gulf War between Iran and Iraq, and the 1988 destruction of Korean Air Lines Boeing 747. She said that since no transfer of sovereignty was involved in the 1878 Deed, no transfer of sovereignty has ever passed to Malaysia. She added that the Philippines has never abandoned its claim over eastern Sabah.

Social policy

Divorce
Defensor Santiago publicly advocated for the passage of a divorce law in the Philippines, saying, "Why would you force [couples] to be together if they want to kill each other by mere sight?" With respect to her position on divorce, she clarified that it should be restricted on two grounds: "an attempt on the life of the spouse by the other" and "when one spouse is already living with another person, that is adultery or concubinage." In the 2016 Presidential campaign, despite being unable to attend the second debate citing health concerns, she reiterated on Twitter her position on divorce, leaving her as the only presidential candidate to favor its legislation.

Abortion and contraception
Defensor-Santiago took a critical perspective of abortion and supports maintaining laws against it: "No to abortion, never. I am a very avid supporter of RH [Reproductive Health] Law, but I will definitely fight to the death against abortion as a lawyer, not necessarily as a religious person. I equate it properly with the crime of murder." On contraception, she stressed the importance of its distribution, especially in poverty-stricken areas. She was a strong proponent of the Philippines' Reproductive Health Law, which guarantees universal access to methods on contraception, maternal health and sex education. According to her, the bill was shelved for more than 13 years, citing the Catholic Church's opposition. Defensor Santiago expressed dismay when the RH Law had suffered a one-billion peso budget cut before the Congress in early 2016. She said if she will be elected, she will work for a full and conscientious implementation of the law.

LGBT rights
Defensor Santiago magnified the issues concerning the LGBT community before the Senate. In the wake of the Orlando nightclub shooting, she said in a Twitter post, "The mass shooting at a club in Orlando is appalling and heartbreaking" and "I long for the day when the LGBT community no longer has to live in fear of discrimination and hate crimes". Defensor Santiago was one of the senators who advocated the immediate investigation of the Jennifer Laude case, wherein the American marine, Joseph Scott Pemberton, killed Laude, a Filipina transgender woman, in Subic, Zambales. She also supported the passage of the anti-discrimination bill (SOGIE Equality Bill) which protects the rights of people of different sexual orientation, gender identity, and expression. She was the first senator in Philippine history to push for the bill's legislation, filing it repeatedly since 2000.

Capital punishment
Defensor Santiago favored the death penalty but limited it to heinous crimes, while maintaining that the justice system should be improved.

Environment
Defensor Santiago vehemently opposed mining. She believes mining is one of the greatest reasons why local communities are impoverished as most of the profit coming from mining are siphoned by mining companies away from the local economy. In addition, mining has made numerous destructive advances in Philippine society and ecosystems, destroying watersheds and agricultural lands, as well as rivers and seas. According to an interview conducted by Haribon Foundation during the 2016 Presidential Campaign, the organization voted her as the "greenest" in all of the candidates. She was the main author of the Climate Change Law and the Renewable Energies Law in the Senate.

Internet
Defensor Santiago advocated the establishment of the Department of Information which is mandated to speed-up internet connectivity in the Philippines which she described "the worst internet speed in Asia". She also advocated for the passage of the Magna Carta for Philippine Internet Freedom which protects the rights and freedoms of Filipinos in cyberspace, while defining and penalizing cybercrimes.

Transportation
Defensor Santiago advocated the establishment of a completely new railway system from Manila to Sorsogon and a new high-speed transit system connecting Metro Manila to Pampanga, Bulacan. Rizal, Batangas, Laguna, and Cavite. She also advocated the establishment of a new modernized airport and the establishment of new projects in every province in the entire country.

Awards and honors

 Ramon Magsaysay Award for Government Service, 1988, Asian equivalent of the Nobel Prize, Magsaysay Awards Foundation
 TOYM Award for Law, 1985 (The Outstanding Young Men) Opened to Women 1984, Philippine Jaycees
 TOWNS Award for Law, 1986 (The Outstanding Women in the Nation's Service), Philippine Lions
 Philippine Judges' Hall of Fame, 2015, Philippine Judges Association
 Most Outstanding Alumna in Law, University of the Philippines, 1988
 Gold Vision Triangle Award for government service, 1988, YMCA Philippines
 Republic Anniversary Award for law enforcement, 1988, Civic Assembly of Women of the Philippines
 Golden Jubilee Achievement Award for public service, 1990, Girl Scouts of the Philippines
 Celebrity Mother Award, 1991, Gintong Ina Awards Foundation
 Spain – Grand Cross of the Order of Civil Merit (November 30, 2007)
 Distinguished Icon of Legal Excellence and Public Service Award (September 2, 2016)
 PUP Online Personality of the Year 2016
: Quezon Service Cross - (December 3, 2018, Posthumous)

Writings
Defensor Santiago wrote at least 30 books, many of which are about law and social sciences. Among her works is the Code Annotated Series Project 2000, a series of books about laws passed by the Philippine Congress and Supreme Court decisions. The Code Annotated Series is the main part of Defensor Santiago's Legal Outreach Program. During her initial battle with cancer, she continued to work on the 2014 edition of all her law books. These were published as the 2015 edition of her Code Annotated Series, by Rex Bookstore.

The doctoral dissertation she wrote for the University of Michigan was published as a book, Political Offences in International Law. She wrote two autobiographies, Inventing Myself  and Cutting Edge: The Politics of Reform in the Philippines, the latter being praised by UK Prime Minister Margaret Thatcher.

She published a joke book in 2014, Stupid is Forever, a collection of jokes, comebacks, one-liners, and pick-up lines she used in speeches. A sequel, titled Stupid is Forevermore, was published a year later. Both books were published by ABS-CBN Publishing. The first book was named the best-selling book of 2014, selling about 110,000 copies in one month.

Personal life
Defensor Santiago grew up in a middle-class erudite household with both parents having higher educational attainments. She is the eldest among her siblings: Benjamin, Nenalyn, Linnea, and Paula Dimpna Beatriz.

She was married to Narciso "Jun" Santiago Jr., with whom she had two sons, Narciso III (Archie) and Alexander (A.R.); Alexander committed suicide in 2003. The couple adopted four children; Megan Santiago, Mallory Santiago, Mackenzie Santiago, and Morven Santiago. She and her husband renewed their wedding vows on their 40th wedding anniversary in 2011. She has close relationships with actress and visual artist, Heart Evangelista, who she has mentored.

Religious views
In general, Defensor Santiago had a complex relationship with religion, at times affirming her membership in the Catholic Church while at other times heavily criticizing and even entertaining the nonexistence of the Christian god.  In 2012, she cited Ecclesiastes as her favorite book in the Bible and had once considered becoming a nun. In an interview with Esquire years after the death of her son who committed suicide, she said:

She stated in a separate interview in 2015:

In the same interview, she affirmed her views on secularism in the country.

It's worth noting that the views she shared in 2015 seem to conflict with both her views in her book Stupid is Forever (published just a year prior to the 2015 interview) where she mentions her defense of the Reproductive Health Law in spite of her asserting her Catholicism, and an interview in 2016 where when asked what she does as both the last thing she does before going to sleep and first thing she does when waking up is "pray".

Defensor Santiago was featured in an episode of ABS-CBN's drama anthology Maalaala Mo Kaya in 2003 where Tessie Tomas, Julia Clarete, Maja Salvador, and Miles Ocampo played the role of Defensor Santiago in different ages. In 2016, GMA Network's television drama anthology Wagas featured the story of Defensor Santiago and her husband Narciso, where she was played by Heart Evangelista.

See also
 Youth Reform Movement
 Senate of the Philippines
 Miriam Defensor Santiago 2016 presidential campaign
 People's Reform Party

References

External links
 Senator Miriam Defensor Santiago - Senate of the Philippines

1945 births
2016 deaths
Deaths from lung cancer in the Philippines
Visayan people
Filipino political scientists
Filipino Roman Catholics
Filipino women judges
Filipino women writers
Order of Civil Merit members
Hiligaynon people
People from Iloilo City
People from Quezon City
People's Reform Party politicians
Candidates in the 1992 Philippine presidential election
Candidates in the 1998 Philippine presidential election
Candidates in the 2016 Philippine presidential election
Ramon Magsaysay Award winners
Roman Catholic writers
Secretaries of Agrarian Reform of the Philippines
Senators of the 10th Congress of the Philippines
Senators of the 11th Congress of the Philippines
Senators of the 13th Congress of the Philippines
Senators of the 14th Congress of the Philippines
Senators of the 15th Congress of the Philippines
Senators of the 16th Congress of the Philippines
University of Michigan Law School alumni
Corazon Aquino administration cabinet members
University of the Philippines Visayas alumni
University of the Philippines Diliman alumni
University of the Philippines College of Law alumni
Burials at the Loyola Memorial Park
21st-century Filipino women politicians
21st-century Filipino politicians
Women members of the Senate of the Philippines
Women members of the Cabinet of the Philippines
Filipino judges of international courts and tribunals
International Criminal Court judges
Recipients of the Quezon Service Cross
Women political scientists
Philippine Collegian editors